Jean Hauert (born 30 October 1911, date of death unknown) was a Swiss épée fencer. He competed at the 1936 and 1948 Summer Olympics.

References

External links
 

1911 births
Year of death missing
Swiss male épée fencers
Olympic fencers of Switzerland
Fencers at the 1936 Summer Olympics
Fencers at the 1948 Summer Olympics